This is a list of lighthouses in Cambodia.

Lighthouses

See also
 Lists of lighthouses and lightvessels

References

External links
 

Cambodia
Lighthouses
Lighthouses